Maskinongé is a regional county municipality in the Mauricie region of Quebec, Canada. The seat is Louiseville. It is located adjacent on the west of Trois-Rivières on the Saint Lawrence River.

The population according to the 2016 Canadian Census was 36,316, an increase of 0.1% over the 2011 population.

History
The RCM was formed on January 1, 1982, and it consisted of Hunterstown Township (now part of Saint-Paulin); Belleau Municipality (now part of Saint-Alexis-des-Monts); the parish municipalities of Saint-Alexis-des-Monts, Sainte-Angèle (since renamed to Sainte-Angèle-de-Premont), Sainte-Anne-d'Yamachiche (now part of Yamachiche), Saint-Antoine-de-la-Rivière-du-Loup (now part of Louiseville), Saint-Barnabé, Saint-Édouard (since renamed to Saint-Édouard-de-Maskinongé), Saint-Joseph-de-Maskinongé (now part of Maskinongé), Saint-Justin, Saint-Léon-le-Grand, Saint-Paulin, Saint-Sévère, and Sainte-Ursule; and the village municipalities of Louiseville, Maskinongé, Saint-Paulin, and Yamachiche.

On January 1, 2002, the municipalities of Charette, Saint-Boniface-de-Shawinigan (since renamed to Saint-Boniface), Saint-Élie (since renamed to Saint-Élie-de-Caxton), Saint-Étienne-des-Grès, and Saint-Mathieu-du-Parc were transferred to the Maskinongé Regional County Municipality when the Centre-de-la-Mauricie and Francheville Regional Counties were dissolved.

Subdivisions
There are 17 subdivisions within the RCM:

Cities & Towns (1)
 Louiseville

Municipalities (11)
 Charette
 Maskinongé
 Saint-Boniface
 Saint-Édouard-de-Maskinongé
 Saint-Élie-de-Caxton
 Saint-Justin
 Saint-Mathieu-du-Parc
 Saint-Paulin
 Sainte-Angèle-de-Prémont
 Sainte-Ursule
 Yamachiche

Parishes (5)
 Saint-Alexis-des-Monts
 Saint-Barnabé
 Saint-Étienne-des-Grès
 Saint-Léon-le-Grand
 Saint-Sévère

Transportation

Access Routes
Highways and numbered routes that run through the municipality, including external routes that start or finish at the county border:

 Autoroutes
 

 Principal Highways
 
 

 Secondary Highways
 
 
 
 

 External Routes
 None

See also
 List of regional county municipalities and equivalent territories in Quebec

References

Census divisions of Quebec
Regional county municipalities in Mauricie